Bishop Fenwick High School is a parochial high school in Franklin, Ohio, USA.

History
The school was opened August 21, 1952 and named in honor of Edward Dominic Fenwick, a Dominican friar and first Roman Catholic Bishop of Cincinnati. The first principal was Rev. Julian Krusling. Due to outgrowing the original site, the school moved on November 20, 1962 to Manchester Road in Middletown. The growth continued and in September 2004 the school moved to a new campus, on State Road 122 on the east side of Middletown.

Academics
The curriculum is accredited by the Ohio Department of Education and the Ohio Catholic School Accrediting Association. Curriculum levels are Advanced College Preparatory study, College Preparatory and General Studies.

Clubs and activities
Fenwick offers many clubs including: 
 
 Academic Team
 Ambassadors
 Art Club
 Drama Club
 Fenwick For Life
 French Club
 Hope Club
 Intramural Basketball
 Key Club
 Liturgical Ministries
 Liturgical Musicians
 Medical Club
 Mock Trial
 National Honors Society
 Ohio Math League
 Peer Mentors
 Radio Club
 Robotics Club
 Run Club
 Ski and Snowboard Club
 Spanish Club
 Spanish Honors Society
 Student Council
 Tech Club
 Ukulele Club

Athletics
Fenwick's sports teams are sanctioned by the Ohio High School Athletic Association. The boys teams compete in the Greater Catholic League. The girls teams compete in the Girls' Greater Cincinnati League. 

Fenwick offers the following fall sports: 

 Marching Band
 Cheer 
 Cross Country 
 Football
 Golf
 Soccer
 Tennis 
 Volleyball

Ohio High School Athletic Association State Championships
Championships: 

 Boys' American football – 1973-74, 1974-75
 Boys' baseball – 1974, 1981
 Boys' basketball – 1982
 Girls' track and field – 1993
 Girls' soccer – 2008, 2012
 Girls' volleyball – 2010, 2019
 Boys' volleyball – 2013, 2021 Prior to 2022–2023 boys' volleyball was sanctioned by the Ohio High School Boys Volleyball Association rather than the OHSAA.

Notable alumni
 Tim Jorden – former NFL tight end

References

External links
Bishop Fenwick High School (alternate)

Roman Catholic Archdiocese of Cincinnati
High schools in Warren County, Ohio
Catholic secondary schools in Ohio
1952 establishments in Ohio